Eugenio Rizzolini (born August 30, 1937 in Milan) is a retired Italian professional football player.

1937 births
Living people
Italian footballers
Serie A players
A.C. Milan players
Inter Milan players
Novara F.C. players
Mantova 1911 players
Brescia Calcio players
Association football defenders